Live in Colorado is an album by Bobby Weir & Wolf Bros.  It was recorded at Red Rocks Amphitheatre in Morrison, Colorado on June 8 and 9, 2021, and at the Gerald R. Ford Amphitheatre in Vail, Colorado on June 11 and 12, 2021.  It was released as a CD and as a two-disc LP on February 18, 2022.

Critical reception 
On Pitchfork Jonathan Willinger said, "There have been previous stints where Weir assumed center stage, rather than looking for someone to fill the space left by Garcia, but Wolf Bros have lasted long enough to establish its own rugged and spacious approach to the music. It feels like a tacit acknowledgement of the need to move on, implying that if Weir is to fully embody the legacy he helped build, part of that is finding other ways to live inside it."

In Glide Magazine Dave Goodwich wrote, "Wolf Bros have gone on to perform nearly eighty shows and have seen their catalog rapidly grow as they continually find ways to reinvent the timeless material of the Grateful Dead in a unique stripped-down fashion that offers up a welcome counterpoint to the bells and whistles that accompany Weir's main project, Dead & Company.... While their laid back style may not be for everyone, Wolf Bros has already proven to be a formidable addition to the Grateful Dead family."

Track listing 
"New Speedway Boogie" (Jerry Garcia, Robert Hunter) – 10:27
"A Hard Rain's a-Gonna Fall" (Bob Dylan) – 9:45
"Big River" (Johnny Cash) – 6:45
"West L.A. Fadeaway" (Garcia, Hunter) – 12:44
"My Brother Esau" (Bob Weir, John Barlow) – 5:40
"Only a River" (Weir, Josh Ritter, Josh Kaufman) – 6:43
"Looks Like Rain" (Weir, Barlow) – 9:53
"Lost Sailor" / "Saint of Circumstance" (Weir, Barlow) – 17:49

Personnel 
Bobby Weir & Wolf Bros
Bobby Weir –  guitar, vocals
Don Was – double bass
Jay Lane – drums
Jeff Chimenti – piano
Greg Leisz – pedal steel guitar
The Wolfpack
Sheldon Brown – tenor saxophone
Alex Kelly – cello
Brian Switzer – trumpet
Adam Theis – trombone
Mads Tolling – violin
Production
Produced by Bobby Weir, Don Was, Jay Lane
Executive producers: Bernie Cahill, Matt Busch
Recording engineers: Derek Featherstone, Michal Kacunel, Vadim Canby
Mixing: Derek Feathersone, Chenao Wang
Mastering: Warren DeFever
Design, layout: Darryl Norsen
Photography: Chris Phelps, Dave Vann

Charts

References 

Bob Weir albums
2022 live albums
Third Man Records live albums